WVBG-FM (105.5 MHz, V 105.5) is a radio station licensed to Redwood, Mississippi, United States, broadcasting a classic hits music format. The station is currently owned by Lendsi Radio, LLC.

References

External links

Classic hits radio stations in the United States
VBG-FM
Radio stations established in 2005
2005 establishments in Mississippi